The Royal Jubilee Maternity Hospital  is a maternity facility in Grosvenor Road, Belfast, Northern Ireland. It is managed by the Belfast Health and Social Care Trust.

History 
The facility has its origins in a private house in Donegall Street where a lying-in hospital was established in 1794. It moved to larger premises in Townsend Street in November 1904. The current facility was built on a site previously occupied by the Belfast Asylum, to the immediate south of the Royal Victoria Hospital. It was officially opened by Lucy Baldwin in October 1933. It joined the National Health Service in 1948. After services were transferred from the Jubilee Maternity Hospital, which had been the maternity unit at the Belfast City Hospital, in May 2000, the facility at Grosvenor Road was renamed the Royal Jubilee Maternity Hospital.

References

Belfast Health and Social Care Trust
Health and Social Care (Northern Ireland) hospitals
Hospital buildings completed in 1933
Hospitals in Belfast
1794 establishments in Ireland
Maternity hospitals in the United Kingdom